Oberst is a senior field officer rank in several German-speaking and Scandinavian countries, equivalent to Colonel. It is currently used by both the ground and air forces of Austria, Germany, Switzerland, Denmark, and Norway. The Swedish rank överste is a direct translation, as are the Finnish rank eversti and the Icelandic rank ofursti.

History and origins
 is a German word. Spelled with a capital O, "" is a noun and defines the military rank of colonel or group captain. Spelled with a lower case o, or "", it is an adjective, meaning "superior, top, topmost, uppermost, highest, chief, head, first, principal, or supreme".

As a family name, Oberst is common in the southwest of Germany, in the area known as the Black Forest (Schwarzwald). The name is also concentrated in the north-central cantons of Switzerland (Aargau & Zürich). Here the Swiss version of Oberst is spelled Obrist. The name first appeared in the thirteenth century in the German-Swiss border area, and early forms were Zoberist and Oberist. The name most likely refers to the "tribe that lives the highest on the mountain" or "the family that lives the highest in the village".

Translated as "superior" or "supreme", the rank of Oberst can trace its origins to the Middle Ages where the term most likely described the senior knight on a battlefield or the senior captain in a regiment. With the emergence of professional armies in the sixteenth and seventeenth centuries, an Oberst became the commander of regiment or battalion-sized formations.

By the eighteenth century,  were typically afforded aides or lieutenants, often titled . This led to formation of the modern German rank of the same name, translated as lieutenant colonel.

Austria
Oberst is the fifth highest rank in the Austrian Armed Forces.

Denmark

Ranked OF-5 within NATO and having the paygrade of M402., it is used in the Royal Danish Army and the Royal Danish Air Force.

Germany

 (short: O) is the highest staff officer rank in the German Army (Heer) and the German Air Force (Luftwaffe).

Oberst in the Bundeswehr

The rank is rated OF-5 in NATO, and is grade A16 or B3 in the pay rules of the Federal Ministry of Defence. It is equivalent to:
 Oberstarzt, Oberstapotheker, and Oberstveterinär in the Joint Medical Service of the German Bundeswehr; 
 Kapitän zur See and Flottenarzt in the German Navy.

On the shoulder straps (Heer, Luftwaffe) there are three silver pips (stars) in silver oak leaves.

Oberst in East Germany

 was in the so-called armed organs of the GDR, represented by Ministry of National Defence, and Ministry for State Security, the highest field officer rank, comparable to the colonel in many NATO-Armed forces (Rangcode OF-5). This was in reference to Soviet military doctrine and in line with other armed forces of the Warsaw Pact.

Oberst in the Wehrmacht
 
 was in the German Reich and Nazi Germany the highest field officer rank, comparable to the OF-5 rank in many NATO-Armed forces. It was equivalent to Kapitän zur See in the Kriegsmarine, and SS-Standartenführer in the Waffen-SS until 1945.

Norway

Sweden

The Swedish variant , is the most senior field grade military officer rank in the Swedish Army and the Swedish Air Force, immediately above the rank of lieutenant colonel and just below the rank of brigadier general. It is equivalent to the naval rank of captain in the Swedish Navy.

Switzerland

Swiss Guard

References
Citations

Bibliography
 
 
 
 

Military ranks of Germany
Military ranks of Austria
Military ranks of Switzerland
Military ranks of Denmark
Military ranks of Norway
Military ranks of Sweden
Military ranks of Finland

da:Oberst
de:Oberst
no:Oberst